The following is a list of newspapers in Singapore.

In circulation
As of 2021, there are a total of 16 newspapers in active circulation of which three are distributed for free. Some of these also carry supplementary tabloid pull-outs sold together with the main spreadsheet, such as Digital Life, Mind Your Body, and Urban, which are distributed together with The Straits Times.

Defunct papers
The Singapore Tiger Standard, an English morning daily accused as "anti-Merdeka" by S. Rajaratnam, closed in 1959 after the People's Action Party came to power.

In 1971, the government crackdown on newspapers perceived to be under foreign influence or with subversive tendencies saw the closing of The Eastern Sun and The Singapore Herald. Editorial executives of Nanyang Siang Pau, which was accused of propagating Chinese ethnic chauvinism, had been ordered detained without trial for a period of at least two years, and publication of the Chinese daily was briefly halted.

English language

Comrade (1946)Daily Advertiser (1890 - 1894)Democrat (1946)
Eastern Daily Mail (1905 - 1906)
Eastern News (1940 - 1941)
Eastern Sun (closed in 1971 for allegation on receiving money from communist intelligence from Hong Kong)
Free Press
Indian Daily Mail (1946 - 1956)Malacca ObserverMalay Daily ChronicleMalaya TribuneMalayan Saturday Post Illustrated
Malayan Saturday Review
Mid-Day Herald and Daily Advertiser
Morning Tribune
New Nation
Penang Guardian and Mercantile Avertiser
Pinang Gazette and Straits Chronicle
Project Eyeball (folded on 1 January 2002, less than two years after its release)
Reporter's Advertiser
Shipping Gazette
Singapore & F.M.S. Weekly AdvertiserSingapore Chronicle and Commercial RegisterSingapore Chronicle (1824 - 1837)Singapore Daily News
Singapore Daily TimesSingapore Herald (1939 - 1941)Singapore Herald  (closed in 1971)Singapore MonitorSingapore NippoSingapore Tiger Standard or Singapore Standard (1950–1959)Singapore Weekly HeraldStraits AdvocateStraits BudgetStraits EchoStraits GuardianStraits Intelligence (1883 - 1886)Straits MailStraits Maritime Journal and General NewsStraits ProduceStraits Telegraph and Daily AdvertiserStraits-Chinese Herald
Streats (merged with Today on 1 January 2005)
Sunday Mirror
Syonan Shimbun
Syonan Shimbun Fortnightly
The Singapore Free Press (1835 - 1962)
Weekend TODAY
Weekly Sun
"My Paper" (merged with "The New Paper" on 1 December 2016)

Chinese language
Chong Shing Yit Pao (中興日報) – established on 20 August 1907; disestablished in 1910. The newspaper was founded and operated by members of the Tongmenghui and was aimed at promoting the 1911 Xinhai Revolution in China. The members responsible for the newspaper were Tan Chor Lam, Teo Eng Hock and Chan Po-yin. The daily distribution involved 1,000 copies. 
Friday Weekly (星期5周报) – established on 21 February 1991; disestablished on 7 January 2009 as zbCOMMA. The newspaper is targeted at secondary school students.
Lat Pau (1881 - 1932)
Lianhe Wanbao (联合晚报) – established on 16 March 1983; disestablished on 24 December 2021. Merged with Shin Min Daily News (新明日报).
Nanyang Siang Pau (南洋商报) – established on 6 September 1923; disestablished on 16 March 1983 as Lianhe Zaobao and Lianhe Wanbao
Nan Chiau Jit Pao
Sin Chew Jit Poh (星洲日报) – established on 15 January 1929; disestablished on 16 March 1983 as Lianhe Zaobao and Lianhe Wanbao
Sin Kuo Min Jit Poh
Sing Po
The Union Times (1906 - 1948)
Thien Nan Shin Pao (1898 - 1905)
Xiao Xian Zhong
Xin Li Bao
Ye Deng Bao
Zhaonan Ribao (1942 - 1945)

Tamil language
Singai Nesan (1887 - 1889)

Malay language
Lembang Malaya
Jawi Peranakkan (1876 - 1895)
Nujum Al-Fajar
Sekolah Melayu
Warta Ahad
Warta Jenaka
Warta Malaya

See also

 Censorship in Singapore
 Communications in Singapore
 Media of Singapore

References 

Singapore

Newspapers